The Canon EOS 50 (also known as the ELAN II in America and the EOS 55 in Japan) is an autofocus, autoexposure 35mm SLR camera. It was aimed at the advanced amateur market, and featured a rear command dial, support for custom functions, and an optional BP-50 battery grip, with a dedicated portrait shutter release. The body was constructed of plastic, with the lens mount and top deck enclosed in an aluminium cover.

Description

Three variants of the camera were produced, each of which was available with a quartz date imprint back. The basic model was the EOS 50. The EOS 50E variant introduced an enhanced version of the 3-zone eye-controlled autofocus system that was first seen on the EOS 5 camera. The Japan-only EOS 55 was also available in an all-black version – rather than only the standard black and silver colour scheme – and included a panorama option. Sliding the button at the bottom of the rear of the camera causes panels to mask off all of the negative except for a 13 mm x 36mm strip in the middle.

The EOS 50 was also the first camera to implement Canon's E-TTL flash system.  Canon's previous TTL system metered light reflected from the film onto a sensor during the actual exposure.  E-TTL on the other hand fires a low-intensity pre-flash before exposure, and meters the reflected light through the camera's normal metering system.

Sales of the EOS 50 began in September 1995, and ended after the introduction of the replacement model, the EOS 30 in October 2000.

References

50